Nona Yuhan Sheriffdeen (born 20 February 1925 – died 22 June 1992 as ජෙමිනි කාන්තා) [Sinhala]), popularly as stage name Jemini Kantha, was an actress in Sri Lankan cinema. One of the earliest pillars of Sinhala cinema, Kantha is considered as the first female comedian in Sinhala cinema. She was a pioneer comedy actress known as "Josi Baba" and singer in early Sri Lankan cinema.

Personal life
Gemini Kantha was born on 20 February 1925 in Meewakkumbura village in Matale to a Malay father.

Career
After the end of school life, Kantha joined the B. A. W. Jayamanne's Minerva Drama Group. She won a reputation as a singer who sang for the discs during the Gramophone era along with Eddie Jayamanne, Mohideen Baig and A.M.U Raj. She became the first comic actress in Sri Lankan cinema with the role of "Josi baba" in Sri Lanka's first film Kadawunu Poronduwa in 1947. She also sang the song Nonage Ale Ge Meda Sale with Eddie Jayamanne.

She has acted in only seven films in a short span of 8 years. She quit cinema after having her first child. She also starred in Bennett Rathnayake's teledrama Tharu, which was her last appearance in career.

Filmography

References

External links
 Jemini Kantha imdb

Sri Lankan film actresses
1925 births
1992 deaths
Sri Lankan stage actresses